Very Present Tense is the debut studio album by British actor Christopher Simpson.

Composition
In 2008, whilst Simpson was artist-in-residence with creative arts group Metal, he completed the song cycle Very Present Tense. He wrote it over a number of years in response to the death of his mother. The songs which reference musical idioms, including blues, jazz, and Rwandan folk, reflecting his Rwandan and Irish family heritage. The album was developed in collaboration with composer Tom Havelock.

Performance
The song cycle premiered at the arts hub in Edge Hill Station pavilion in Liverpool on 8 August 2008, during the Liverpool European Capital of Culture. He performed the work for the second time with Metal at the Village Green Festival on 29 September 2009, this time working with a group of musicians from Southend. Simpson then worked on recording the work.

Track listing

References

External links

2008 debut albums
Kinyarwanda-language albums
Christopher Simpson (actor) albums